The Football Federation of Cambodia (FFC;) is a governing body that administers some association football and futsal activities in Cambodia.

Name
 1933 to 1998: Fédération Khmère de Football Association (FKFA)
 1998 to 2006: Cambodian Football Federation (CFF)

Staff

Tournaments

Leagues
 Cambodian Premier League
 Cambodian League 2
 Cambodian Women's League

Cups
 Hun Sen Cup
 CNCC League Cup
 CNCC Charity Cup

National teams
 Cambodia national football team
 Cambodia national futsal team
 Cambodia national under-17 football team
 Cambodia national under-21 football team
 Cambodia national under-23 football team
 Cambodia women's national football team
 Cambodia women's national under-16 football team
 Cambodia women's national under-19 football team

References

External links
 Website
 AFC website
 FIFA website
 ASEAN website

Cambodia
Football in Cambodia
Sports organizations established in 1933
1933 establishments in Cambodia